The ninth season of NCIS an American police procedural drama originally aired on CBS from September 20, 2011, through May 15, 2012.

Cast and characters

Main 
 Mark Harmon as Leroy Jethro Gibbs, NCIS Supervisory Special Agent (SSA) of the Major Case Response Team (MCRT) assigned to Washington's Navy Yard
 Michael Weatherly as Anthony DiNozzo, NCIS Senior Special Agent, second in command of MCRT
 Cote de Pablo as Ziva David, NCIS Junior Special Agent
 Pauley Perrette as Abby Sciuto, Forensic Specialist for NCIS
 Sean Murray as Timothy McGee, NCIS Special Agent
 Rocky Carroll as Leon Vance, NCIS Director
 David McCallum as Dr. Donald "Ducky" Mallard, Chief Medical Examiner for NCIS

Also starring 
 Brian Dietzen as Jimmy Palmer, Assistant Medical Examiner for NCIS

Recurring 
 Philip Casnoff as Sean Latham, NCIS target
 Wendy Makkena as Dr. Rachel Cranston, a psychiatrist and Caitlin Todd's sister
 Sarah Jane Morris as E.J. Barrett, NCIS Senior Special Agent
 Matt Willig as Simon Cade, NCIS Special Agent
 Matt Craven as Clayton Jarvis, Secretary of the Navy
 Scott Wolf as Casey Stratton, NCIS target
 Jack Conley as Danny Sportelli, Metro P.D. Detective
 Diane Neal as Abigail Borin, CGIS Special Agent in Charge
 Daniel Louis Rivas as Kyle Davis, Abby's brother
 Joe Spano as Tobias Fornell, FBI Senior Special Agent
 Melinda McGraw as Diane Sterling, Gibbs' and Fornell's ex-wife
 John Finn as Gen. Charles T. Ellison, retired Commandant of the Marine Corps
 Meredith Eaton as Carol Wilson, immunologist and a friend of Abby Sciuto
 Matt L. Jones as Ned Dorneget, NCIS Probationary Special Agent
 Robert Wagner as Anthony DiNozzo, Sr., Tony's father
 Enrique Murciano as Ray Cruz, rogue CIA Agent
 Michelle Pierce as Breena Slater, Jimmy Palmer's fiancée
 Larry Miller as Ed Slater, Breena's father and Palmer's soon-to-be father-in-law
 Darby Stanchfield as Shannon Gibbs, Gibbs' deceased wife
 Sam Schuder as Kelly Gibbs, Gibbs' deceased daughter
 Michael O'Neill as Riley McCallister, retired Senior Special Agent for NCIS
 Ralph Waite as Jackson Gibbs, Gibbs' father
 Jamie Lee Curtis as Dr. Samantha Ryan, head of DoD PsyOps Division
 Tamer Hassan as Agah Bayar, NCIS target
 Paula Newsome as Jackie Vance, Leon Vance's wife
 Akinsola Aribo as Jared Vance, Leon Vance's son
 Kiara Muhammad as Kayla Vance, Leon Vance's daughter
 Richard Schiff as Harper Dearing, NCIS target

Guests 
 Lily Tomlin as Penelope Langston, McGee's grandmother
 Sasha Alexander as Caitlin Todd, deceased NCIS Special Agent who was killed by Ari Haswari
 Tim Kelleher as Chris Pacci, deceased NCIS Special Agent
 Rudolf Martin as Ari Haswari, deceased rogue Mossad Agent who killed Caitlin Todd
 Muse Watson as Mike Franks, deceased retired Senior Special Agent for NCIS and Gibbs' former boss
 Lauren Holly as Jenny Shepard, deceased NCIS Director
 Michael Kelly as Jim Porter, NCIS Special Agent, second in command in San Diego

Episodes

Production

Development 
NCIS was renewed for a ninth season on February 2, 2011.

Reception 
NCIS ranked #3 with a total of 19.49 million viewers for the 2011–12 U.S. television season.

Ratings

References 

General references

External links 

 
 

2011 American television seasons
2012 American television seasons
NCIS 09